Robert Fernandez (born 29 September 1986) is an Indian first-class cricketer who plays for Kerala.

References

External links
 

1986 births
Living people
Indian cricketers
Kerala cricketers
Cricketers from Kochi